Virgin Limited Edition, part of Sir Richard Branson’s Virgin Group of business ventures, is a collection of holiday retreats around the world.

Properties 
Current
 Kasbah Tamadot hotel in Asni, Morocco
 The Lodge, a ski lodge in Verbier, Switzerland
 Moskito Island and Necker Island, private islands in the British Virgin Islands
 Son Bunyola, a pair of villas in Mallorca, Spain.
 Ulusaba, a game reserve in Mpumalanga, South Africa
 Mont Rochelle, a hotel and vineyard in South Africa
 Mahali Mzuri, a luxury safari camp in Kenya
Former
 The Roof Gardens, Europe's largest roof garden and restaurant in London. Closed 2 January 2018.

See also

 
Organizations established in 2010
L
2010 establishments in the United Kingdom